This is a list of places of worship in Seattle, Washington:

Churches and cathedrals
Blessed Sacrament Church (Seattle)
Fifth Church of Christ, Scientist (Seattle, Washington)
First Church of Christ, Scientist (Seattle, Washington)
First Methodist Protestant Church of Seattle
Grace Gospel Chapel
Immanuel Lutheran Church (Seattle, Washington)
North American Martyrs Catholic Church
Plymouth Church Seattle
St. Demetrios Greek Orthodox Church (Seattle)
St. James Cathedral (Seattle)
St. Mark's Episcopal Cathedral, Seattle
Saint Spiridon Orthodox Cathedral
Scum of the Earth Church
Seventh Church of Christ, Scientist (Seattle, Washington)
Sixth Church of Christ, Scientist (Seattle, Washington)
Trinity Episcopal Parish Church (Seattle)
University Presbyterian Church (Seattle, Washington)
University Unitarian Church

Other
Bikur Cholim Machzikay Hadath
Dai Bai Zan Cho Bo Zen Ji
Temple De Hirsch Sinai
Ohaveth Sholum Congregation
Seattle Buddhist Church
Sephardic Bikur Holim Congregation